Beňatina is a village and municipality in the Sobrance District in the Košice Region of east Slovakia.

History
In historical records the village was first mentioned in 1333.

Geography
It has a population of about 260 people.

Culture
The village has a public library, and a football pitch

Genealogical resources

The records for genealogical research are available at the state archive "Statny Archiv in Presov, Slovakia"

 Roman Catholic church records (births/marriages/deaths): 1837-1931 (parish B)

 Greek Catholic church records (births/marriages/deaths): 1824-1851 (parish B)

See also
 List of municipalities and towns in Slovakia

External links
 
http://en.e-obce.sk/obec/benatina/benatina.html
https://web.archive.org/web/20070427022352/http://www.statistics.sk/mosmis/eng/run.html
http://www.benatina.ocu.sk
Surnames of living people in Benatina

Villages and municipalities in Sobrance District